"Superwoman (Where Were You When I Needed You)" is a 1972 soul track by Stevie Wonder. It was the second track on Wonder's Music of My Mind album, and was also released as the first single. The song reached a peak of number 33 on the Billboard Hot 100 chart.

Background
In essence a two-part song, there is a coherence in that it tells a story of the singer's relationship with "Mary". The first part covers her desire to be a star, and to leave behind her old life to become a movie star. The second part covers the narrator's wondering why she had not come back as soon as he had hoped. The second part of the song is also a reworking of the song "Never Dreamed You'd Leave in Summer" from the 1971 album Where I'm Coming From.

The song, both in its sound and length, was a change of pace for Wonder, who was trying to establish his own identity outside of the Motown sound. Besides its floaty ambience, it featured the singer as a virtual one-man band.

Cash Box said of the song "Superwoman, superproduction, supersong, superhit: AM and FM, pop/soul and MOR."

Personnel 
 Stevie Wonder – lead vocal, background vocal, Rhodes piano, drums, Moog bass, T.O.N.T.O. synthesizer
 Buzz Feiten – electric guitar

Chart performance

Notable covers 
In 1973, R&B group The Main Ingredient covered the song in their album, "Afrodisiac". In 1997, soul vocalist Eric Benet covered the song in an arrangement by keyboardist George Duke which was featured on the soundtrack of US sitcom Living Single. Duke again covered the song from his 2005 album Duke.

References 

1972 singles
Stevie Wonder songs
Songs written by Stevie Wonder
1970s ballads
Rhythm and blues ballads
Song recordings produced by Stevie Wonder